Natasha Eloi (born in Hammersmith, England) is a Canadian television personality and videographer. She is most often seen on the Space channel as a space, science and technology reporter and on The Circuit as the resident toy expert. She also hosts a show called It Came From The Basement! where she takes a look at people's collections related to science fiction memorabilia. She was a co-presenter on the 2001: A Space Road Odyssey and the Spacey Awards from 2003 to 2006.

She graduated from Stephen Leacock Collegiate Institute in Toronto.

TV appearances as herself 
 June 2000 and August 2001 - TSN's Off The Record
 August 2000 to Present - SFX Convention
 October 2001 - First Wave
 July 2001 - Toronto Star's Best Dressed of 2001
 January 21, 2001 - CTV's Open Mike With Mike Bullard
 September 18–24, 2003 - NOW Magazine 'My Style' Feature
 September 2004 - Women In Media Foundation Commercial

Awards 
 September 2000 - Space Frontier Foundation Award for Best Vision of Reality/Best Vision of the Future

References

External links 
 
 NOW Toronto article
 Space: The Imagination Station - Biography of Natasha Eloi

Year of birth missing (living people)
Living people
Black Canadian broadcasters
Black Canadian women
Black British television personalities
Canadian television hosts
Canadian television producers
British emigrants to Canada
People from Hammersmith
People from Toronto
Canadian women television hosts
Canadian women television producers